The Democratic Revolutionary Alliance ( or ARDE) were the Southern Front guerrillas in Nicaragua that fought against the Marxist elements of the original Sandinista Revolution in 1979. Despite being one of the Contra forces, they maintained an ideological distance from the U.S.-backed Nicaraguan Democratic Force (Contras).

Formation
Formed by Edén Pastora Gómez in 1982, it united his Sandino Revolutionary Front (FRS) with such groups as the Nicaraguan Democratic Movement (MDN), MISURASATA and FARN. A.R.D.E. quickly gained momentum in the southeast of Nicaragua. The San Juan River was "liberated" by ARDE, and five strategic bases were formed, including Sarapiquí and La Penca.

Pastora's leadership can charitably be described as mercurial. Planes, helicopters, weapons and food supplies meant for combatants risking their lives frequently were sold to third parties. Organizational chaos reigned, as Pastora feared that institutional structures could pose a counterweight and threat to his charisma-based leadership.

Activities in the 1980s
As ARDE's regional field commanders penetrated deeper and deeper into Nicaragua they became increasingly frustrated at the squandering of resources, the constant bickering with other factions of the armed struggle against the alleged communist dictatorship, and Pastora's erratic directives. In 1985, other rebel groups, including former ARDE political head Alfonso Robelo, formed the United Nicaraguan Opposition umbrella group. Fernando "El Negro" Chamorro of the UNO-aligned FARN sought to win over ARDE commanders, and in November, ARDE units encountered Nicaraguan Democratic Force (FDN) elements moving down from the north.

Six southern front regional commanders led by Navegante (Nueva Guinea), Ganso (El Rama), and Leonel (Chontales) deposed the mercurial Comandante Cero in early 1986 and forged battlefield alliances with their other guerrillas from the FDN such as Franklyn and Apache. This led to both their greatest battlefield successes and a renewal of American aid.

Current activities
After the 1990 elections, the Sandinistas were relegated to secondary status and a shaky democracy took hold. The Southern Front Contras continue their fight, and as of 2004 finally gained title to viable farmland in the vicinity of El Rama.

External links
"Human Rights Abuses by Sandinistas in south of Nicaragua" James LeMoyne 1987 New York Times
"Sandinistas Uproot Villagers to Limit Support for Contras" New York Times
"The War Ends—Where is Peace?"
"ARDE Demobilized fight for land"
"War for the Land in El Rama"

Notes

Guerrilla movements in Latin America
History of Nicaragua
Anti-communism
Paramilitary organizations based in Nicaragua
Organizations of the Nicaraguan Revolution